Palatinate-Mosbach was a state of the Holy Roman Empire centred on Mosbach and Eberbach in the north of modern Baden-Württemberg, Germany.

Palatinate-Mosbach was created in 1410 out of the partition of the Palatinate after the death of King Rupert III for his son Otto. In 1448 Otto inherited half of Palatinate-Neumarkt, purchased the other half, and renamed his state Palatinate-Mosbach-Neumarkt.

Rulers
Otto I (1410–1448)

House of Wittelsbach
Counties of the Holy Roman Empire
History of the Palatinate (region)